Isochariesthes lesnei is a species of beetle in the family Cerambycidae. It was described by Stephan von Breuning in 1934, originally under the genus Pseudochariesthes.

Subspecies
 Isochariesthes lesnei lesnei (Breuning, 1934)
 Isochariesthes lesnei sudanica (Breuning, 1962)

Varietas
 Isochariesthes lesnei var. lockleyi (Breuning, 1934)
 Isochariesthes lesnei var. sulphurea (Breuning, 1939)

References

lesnei
Beetles described in 1934